Geophilus erzurumensis is a species of soil centipede in the family Geophilidae found only in Erzurum, Turkey, which it is named after.

Taxonomy
G. erzurumensis was originally placed in the genus Brachygeophilus based on its lack of sternal pores. It may be a synonym of Pachymerium ferrugineum, along with Geophilus orientis, G. eudontus, and G. elazigus.

References

erzurumensis
Animals described in 1952
Arthropods of Turkey
Taxa named by Ralph Vary Chamberlin